Val-John Star (born ) is a Nauruan male weightlifter, competing in the 85 kg category and representing Nauru at international competitions. He won gold medal at 2010 Oceania Weightlifting Championship in Suva at the 85 kg category. He participated at the 2010 Commonwealth Games in the 85 kg event. He won the bronze medal at the 2011 Pacific Games.

Major competitions

References

1989 births
Living people
Nauruan male weightlifters
Weightlifters at the 2010 Commonwealth Games
Commonwealth Games competitors for Nauru
Place of birth missing (living people)